Arsabenzene (IUPAC name: arsinine) is an organoarsenic heterocyclic compound with the chemical formula C5H5As. It belongs to a group of compounds called heteroarenes that have the general formula C5H5E (E= N, P, As, Sb, Bi).

This air sensitive liquid has an onion odor, and it decomposes on heating. Arsabenzene is also an ambidentate ligand that prefers to coordinate using η1(As)- or η6(π)-routes.

The study of arsabenzene and related compounds was an important step in the understanding of compounds that contain multiple bonds between carbon and heavier elements. 

The study of heteroarenes was begun by Märkl, with the synthesis of 2,4,6-triphenylphosphabenzene. This is achieved by treating 2,4,6-trisubstituted pyrylium salt with phosphanes. The first derivative of arsabenzene was 9-arsaanthracene prepared by Jutzi and Bickelhaupt.

Structure 
Arsabenzene is planar. The C—C bond distances of 1.39 Å, the As—C bond has a length of 1.85 Å, this is 6.6% shorter than the normal As—C single bond.

NMR spectroscopy carried out on arsabenzene indicates that it has a diamagnetic ring current.

Synthesis 
Arsabenzene is synthesized in a two step process from 1,4-pentadiyne. The diyne reacts with dibutylstannane to give 1,1-dibutylstannacyclohexa-2,5-diene.   The organotin compound undergoes As/Sn exchange with arsenic trichloride to give 1-chloroacyclohexadiene, which loses a HCl upon heating, forming the arsabenzene.

CH2(CHCH)2SnBu2 + AsCl3 → CH2(CHCH)2AsCl + Bu2SnCl2

CH2(CHCH)2AsCl → C5H5As + HCl

Reactions 
Arsabenzene undergoes electrophilic aromatic substitution at its ortho and para positions. It also undergoes Friedel-Crafts acylation.

Whereas pyridine does not normally undergo a Diels–Alder reaction, arsabenzene behaves as a diene with hexafluoro-2-butyne.  The corresponding phosphorine and benzene undergo the analogous reaction at 100 °C and 200 °C, respectively. Thus the ability of these heterobenzenes to undergo the Diels Alder reaction with this electrophile increases down the periodic table. Bismabenzene is so reactive that it exists in equilibrium with its dimer.

Arsabenzene is far less basic than pyridine, being unreactive with Lewis acids. Trifluoroacetic acid does not protonate the molecule.

See also
 6-membered aromatic rings with one carbon replaced by another group:borabenzene, silabenzene, germabenzene, stannabenzene, pyridine, phosphorine, arsabenzene, stibabenzene, bismabenzene, pyrylium, thiopyrylium, selenopyrylium, telluropyrylium
 Benzene

References 

Arsenic heterocycles
Six-membered rings